Cambrai is a railway station serving the town Cambrai, Nord department, northern France.

Services

The station is served by regional trains to Douai, Valenciennes, Saint-Quentin and Lille.

References

External links

 SNCF page with station facilities, opening times, schedules, etc

Railway stations in Nord (French department)
Gare de Cambrai